Woolston, in the north of the county of Shropshire, England, is a hamlet located in the parish of Oswestry Rural, just to the south east of Maesbury Marsh, near Oswestry (in the St Oswald electoral division of Shropshire Council unitary authority, previously part of the borough of Oswestry until its abolition in 2009). Nearby is St Winifred's Well.

Villages in Shropshire